The 2017 European Athletics U20 Championships were the 24th edition of the biennial European U20 athletics championships. They were held in Grosseto, Italy from 20 July to 23 July.

Medal summary

Men

Track

Field

Combined

Women

Track

Field

Combined

Medal table

Participation
According to an unofficial count, 1,227 athletes from 47 countries participated in the event.

References

External links

Results (archived)

European Athletics U20 Championships
International athletics competitions hosted by Italy
European Athletics Junior Championships
European Athletics Junior Championships
European Athletics Junior Championships
European Athletics Junior Championships
Sport in Grosseto